Martin Hrabĕ de Angelis is a German geneticist and director of the Institute of Experimental Genetics at Helmholtz Zentrum München and director of the European Mouse Mutant Archive (EMMA) in Monterotondo, Italy. Since 2003 he has held the Chair of Experimental Genetics at Technische Universität München. He is co-founder, speaker and board member of the German Center for Diabetes Research (DZD). His research focuses on metabolism and diabetes, large-scale functional genomics/genetics and epigenetics.

Career 
Hrabĕ de Angelis studied biology at Philipps-Universität Marburg and completed his doctorate in 1994 with a dissertation on the influence of growth factors on early embryonic development (1985–1994). From 1994 to1997 he was a postdoc at The Jackson Laboratory in Bar Harbor (US). There he analyzed the delta/notch signaling pathway of the mouse and investigated mouse mutations as a model for somitogenesis. From 1997 to 2000, Hrabĕ de Angelis was head of the research group "Functional Genetics" at the Institute of Mammalian Genetics of the former Society for Radiation Research, GSF (now Helmholtz Zentrum München). Since 2000 he has been director of the Institute of Experimental Genetics at Helmholtz Zentrum München. In 2003 he was appointed to the Chair of Experimental Genetics at Technische Universität München. At the same time, he is director of the pan-European research consortium INFRAFRONTIER. In 2001 Hrabĕ de Angelis founded the German Mouse Clinic (GMC) for the systemic analysis of human diseases. The main research focus is the elucidation of genetic and epigenetic factors of diabetes mellitus. Hrabĕ de Angelis was co-founder of the German Center for Diabetes Research in 2009. (DZD) (https://dzd-ev.de) and is a speaker and board member. He is a past-president (president 2017-18) of the International Mammalian Genome Society.

Using a mouse model, Hrabĕ de Angelis has shown that dietary obesity and diabetes can be epigenetically inherited to offspring both via oocytes and sperm. By studying knockout mice, each of which lacked a precisely selected gene, he succeeded in identifying a network of genes that could play an important role in the development of metabolic diseases such as diabetes (3).

Hrabĕ de Angelis has published more than 500 scientific articles in peer-reviewed journals (Google Scholar Citations: 38759) as well as numerous articles in reference books. His h-index is 90.

Awards and honors (selection) 

 2003 Paula und Richard von Hertwig Prize for Interdisciplinary Collaboration
 2010 Paula und Richard von Hertwig Prize for Interdisciplinary Collaboration
 2016 Honorary doctorate from the University of Tübingen, Germany
 2018 Honorary doctorate from Ludwig-Maximilians-Universität, Germany
 2018 Acceptance as member in the German National Academy of Sciences Leopoldina 
 2018 Honorary Doctorate from the Technical University of Dresden, Germany

Memberships in scientific associations (selection) 

 Since 1999 Member of the Mutagenesis Scientific Advisory Board (SAB), The Jackson Laboratory
 2006-2009 Speaker of the Project Committee of the National Genome Research Network
 Since 2008 Coordinator “INFRAFRONTIER – Functional Genomics in the Mouse as a Model” 
 Since 2009 Board member of the German Center for Diabetes Research (DZD)   
 Since 2009 Member of the Steering Committee of the International Mouse Phenotyping Consortium (IMPC)

References

External links 
 Prof. Dr. Martin Hrabě de Angelis – Helmholtz Zentrum München, website 

Living people
Year of birth missing (living people)
Place of birth missing (living people)
German geneticists
21st-century German scientists
University of Marburg alumni
Academic staff of the Technical University of Munich
21st-century biologists
German medical researchers
Members of the German Academy of Sciences Leopoldina